Meghanada, also referred to by his epithet Indrajita , according to Hindu texts, was the crown prince of Lanka, who conquered Indraloka (Heaven). He is regarded as one of the greatest warriors in Hindu texts. He is a major character mentioned in the Indian epic Ramayana. Meghnada is the central character in Bengali ballad Meghnad Badh Kavya. He played an active role in the great war between Rama and Ravana. He acquired many kinds of celestial weapons from his Guru Shukra. His most prominent feat is having defeated the devas in heaven. Using the Brahmastra, Indrajita killed 670 million vanaras in a single day; nearly exterminating the entirety of the vanara race. No warrior had ever achieved this statistical feat before in the Ramayana.

Etymology

Indrajita had the special ability to fight from the sky, hidden behind the clouds. That is why both Rama and Lakshmana were defeated during the battle and were tied up by the snake. In Sanskrit, the literal translation of the name "Indrajita" (इन्द्रजित) is mentioned as the "Conqueror of Indra" and "Meghanāda" as " Lord of the sky". In Tamil, the literal translation of the name "Meghanathan" is mentioned as the "Lord of Clouds", which combines the words "Megham" (clouds) and "Nathan" (lord). He defeated Indra, the king of the devas, after which he came to be known as "Indrajita" (the conqueror of Indra). He is also known as Shakrajit, Ravani, Vasavajit, Varidanada, and Ghananada.

Early life

Indrajita was the oldest son of Ravana and his wife Mandodari. He was named Meghanada after his birth because his birth cry sounded like thunder. When Meghanada was going to be born, Ravana wished his son to be supreme so that no one in the world could defeat him. Ravana wanted his son to be the ultimate warrior and extremely knowledgeable. Ravana was a great astrologer. To make his son immortal, he commanded all the planets and constellations in such a position that would allow his son to be born the way he wanted. Because of Ravana's anger and power, all the planets and constellations feared him. All the planets were in the position as desired by Ravana at time of his son Meghanada's birth. All the planets aligned in such a way that they came in the 11th house of Meghanada's horoscope. However, Shani (Saturn) had disobeyed Ravana's orders and had settled in the 12th house of Meghanada's horoscope. Ravana became furious at this and blamed Shani. Due to the state of Shani, Meghanada had to die at the hands of Lakshmana in the war between Prince Rama and Ravana.

Meghanada was also an expert in magical warfare, sorcery and tantra. His wife is not mentioned in the original epic; however in later versions of the epic, Sulochana—the daughter of the King of the serpents Shesha Naga—is mentioned as his wife.

Brahma's boon

During the battle between the devas and Ravana, Lord Indra, king of heavens accompanied by all other devas captured Ravana. To rescue his father, Meghanada attacked Indra and his elephant Airavata, and defeated all the devas, even Indra . Meghanada tied and mounted Indra onto his celestial chariot and brought him to Ravana in Lanka. Ravana and Meghanada decided to kill Indra. At this juncture, Lord Brahma intervened and asked Meghanada to free Indra. Meghanada obliged and was granted a chance to ask for a boon from Brahma. Meghanada asked for immortality, but Brahma remarked that absolute immortality is against the law of the nature. Instead, he was then granted another boon that after the completion of the Yagna (fire-worship) of his native goddess Prathyangira or the "Nikumbhila yagna" would be completed, he will get a celestial chariot, mounting on which, any enemy can't kill him in a war and become invulnerable. But Brahma also cautioned him that whosoever would destroy this yagna, would also kill him. Brahma was highly impressed by Meghanada's valor in this war and it was Brahma who coined him the name Indrajita ("the conqueror of Indra"). It is also believed that Meghanada was granted another boon by Brahma in which it was promised to him that he would only be killed by a common man who hadn't slept for 12 years continuously.

Role in battle

Meghanada was the greatest warrior on Ravana's side. He was a great archer and unsurpassed grand master in illusion warfare techniques.

First Day

On the first day of his battle with Rama's army, Indrajita was fast with his weapons. Angada did defeat Indrajita and forced him to retreat . However, he swiftly wiped out the armies of Sugriva, calling on Rama and Lakshmana to come in a direct combat by his illusion tactics of sorcery, so he could avenge the deaths of his paternal uncle and his brothers. When Lakshmana appeared before him, he fought fiercely and used his most nefarious weapon Nagapasha (a trap made of a million snakes). Rama and Lakshmana fell on the ground breathless. They were rescued by Garuda on behest of Hanuman. Garuda was the uncle of Jatayu and Sampati and the enemy of the serpents and also the flying vehicle of Vishnu, of whom Rama was the seventh avatar.

Second Day

When Indrajita discovered that both Rama and Lakshmana had been rescued by Garuda and were still alive, he was livid and vowed to kill at least one of the brothers on that day. When the battle started, he used all his force to cast a havoc on the armies of Sugriva. At this Lakshmana appeared before him and fought him fiercely. Indrajita used his supreme magical powers, darting across the clouds and skies like a bolt of lightning. He combined his skills of sorcery and illusion warfare, repeatedly vanishing and reappearing behind Lakshmana's back. He was invisible but his arrows injured Lakshmana. Indrajita used the Vasavi Sakthi against Lakshmana, and upon being impaled Lakshmana fell unconscious, poised to die precisely at the following sunrise. His life was saved by Hanuman, who brought the whole mountain of Dronagiri from the Himalayas to Lanka overnight to find the remedy (the magical herb - Sanjivani) for the weapon used by Indrajita and cured him. Although there is false speculation that Rama fought, too. Dharma does not allow multiple warriors to fight against one and it was only Lakshmana who was injured because it is against moral duty to fight against an invisible warrior.

Third day

When Indrajita learned that Lakshmana had survived again, he went to his native deity's secret temple to perform the yagna that would make him a warrior who can't be killed by anyone. Vibhishana, Indrajita's paternal uncle who left Ravana to join Rama, learned of his nephew Indrajita's plans through his spies and alerted Rama. Lakshmana and Vibhisana took the opportunity to face Indrajita in the "Yagnaagaar", where Indrajita would not touch any weapons. As the Valmiki Ramayana quotes, upon his Yagna being destroyed by the armies of Lakshmana, Indrajita became enraged and stormed out of the Temple Cave. 
Seeing his uncle Vibhishana at Lakshmana's side multiplied Indrajita's fury manyfold. He vowed to kill his uncle Vibhisana along with Lakshmana once and for all, letting loose the Yama-astra which he had been conserving for punishing Vibhishana's perceived treason. At this juncture, Lakshmana protected Vibhishana, countering the Yama-astra owing to an earlier warning by Kubera. Indrajita realised that Lakshmana was not an ordinary human and had met the criteria to defeat Indrajita, i.e. blunder the yagna and not sleep for more than 12 years. Indrajita vanished briefly from the battlefield, returning to Ravana at the royal palace, and reported the developments, proposing that his father make peace with Rama. Ravana, blinded with pride, was unrelenting and annoyed, claiming that Indrajita was a coward for having fled the battlefield. This accusation provoked Indrajita who briefly lost his temper, striking fear even at the mighty Ravana's heart before apologizing and clarifying to his father that his primary duty as a son was to serve his father's best interests and that even in the face of death, he would never abandon Ravana. Preparing to return to the battle and knowing that he indeed faced death at the hands of a heavenly incarnation, Indrajita said his last goodbyes to his parents and his wife. He returned to the battlefield and fought Lakshmana with all his skill at both illusion warfare and sorcery. The arrows of Indrajita refused to harm Lakshmana because Lakshmana was the incarnation of Shesha. Lakshmana slew Indrajita by beheading him with the Anjalikastra. It was possible only because of a curse given to Indrajita by Shesha for marrying his daughter without his permission. Shesha incarnated as Rama's brother Lakshmana, to kill Indrajita, didn't have any sleep for  more than twelve years during their exile so that he would be able to serve Rama and Sita efficiently and meet the criteria to kill Indrajita.

In popular culture 
 In the Tamil movie, 'Seetha Jananam or Vedavathi (1941), M.G. Ramachandran, played the Indrajita character.
 Meghnada or Indrajita is the central character in Michael Madhusudan Dutt's Bengali epic poem, Meghnad Badh Kavya (English: The Slaying of Meghnada).

See also
 Valmiki
 Ramayana
 Meghnad Bodh Kavya
 Hindu mythological wars
 Patalkot, India

References

External links

Intarachit in the Thai Ramakian (Ramayana)
The Slaying of Meghanada by Michael Madhusudan Datta  (https://home.uchicago.edu/cbs2/Megha.html)

Rakshasa in the Ramayana
Danavas
Characters in the Ramayana